Steven Foti (born December 3, 1958) is a Wisconsin lobbyist. Previously, he served as a Republican lawmaker in the Wisconsin State Assembly, where he rose to the rank of majority leader.

Career
Born in Oconomowoc, Wisconsin, Foti was a real estate salesman and ex-bartender before serving in the Assembly for 22 years.
  
In the fall of 2002, Foti and other legislative leaders were ensnared in a caucus scandal. He was charged with one felony count for using his public office to campaign on state time. He pleaded guilty to one misdemeanor, and was sentenced to 60 days in jail with two years of probation.

After leaving the Wisconsin Legislature in 2005, Foti became a lobbyist.

References

People from Oconomowoc, Wisconsin
Members of the Wisconsin State Assembly
1958 births
Living people
Wisconsin politicians convicted of crimes
21st-century American politicians